Adams Avenue is a historic road in Memphis, Tennessee.

Adams Avenue may also refer to:
 Adams Avenue Bridge, a historic bridge in Philadelphia, Pennsylvania
 Adams Avenue Bridge (San Diego), in San Diego, California
 Adams Avenue Parkway, a toll road in Utah

See also
 Adams Avenue Historic District, district in Memphis, Tennessee